Mount Monashee is a summit in British Columbia. At an elevation of 3274 meters (10,741 feet), it is the highest point in the Monashee Mountains.

Mount Monashee was first summited by Arnold Wexler, Sterling Hendricks, and Donald Hubbard in 1952, during a trip through the range wherein they also summited Mount Hallam and Dominion Mountain for the first times, and found a new path up Mount Lempriere.

Mount Monashee is the type locality of a formerly recognized subspecies of American pika. The Monashees American pika was no longer recognized as a distinct subspecies in 2010 after studies in genetic markers, call dialects, and skull measurements done by David Hafner and Andrew Smith showed there was mingling of pika populations in British Columbia.

See also 

 Mountain peaks of Canada
 List of the most prominent summits of Canada
 List of mountain peaks of North America

References 

North American 3000 m summits
Mountains of British Columbia
Monashee Mountains
Three-thousanders of British Columbia